As Raw As Ever is a studio album released by Shabba Ranks, his first to be well received by critics and the public.

Track listing 
All Songs Published By Aunt Hilda Music.
 Trailor Load a Girls - 3:58 (Cleveland "Clevie" Browne, Wycliffe Johnson, Greville Gordon)
 Where Does Slackness Come From - 3:48  (Gordon)
 Woman Tangle - 3:48 (Gordon, Clifton Dillon)
 Gun Pon Me - 3:53 (Leopold Hartley, Shabba Ranks)
 Gone Up - 3:55 (Gordon)
 Housecall (featuring Maxi Priest) - 3:39 (Dillon, Brian Thompson, Maxi Priest, Mike Bennett, Ranks)
 Flesh Axe - 4:10 (Browne, Dillon, Johnson)
 A Mi Di Girls Dem Love - 3:29 (Gordon,  Ranks)
 Fist-A-Ris - 3:33 (Gordon, Ranks)
 The Jam (featuring KRS-One) - 3:22 (KRS-One, Dillon, Joseph Longo, Lawrence Krisna Parker, Stephanie Mills)
 Ambi Get Scarce - 3:52 (Hartley, Ranks)
 Park Yu Benz - 3:26 (Gordon, Ranks)

Personnel
Shabba Ranks: Vocal
Mikey Bennett, Paul "Wrong Move" Crossdale, Michael Fletcher, Handel Tucker: Keyboards
Earl Smith: Guitars
Stephen "Cat" Coore: Guitars, Vocals
Danny Dennis, Wycliffe "Steely" Johnson: Bass, Keyboards
Cleveland "Clevie" Browne, Sly Dunbar, George "Dusty" Miller: Drums, Percussion
Danny Browne: Keyboards, Bass, Drums, Percussion
Chevelle Franklin, Brian & Tony Gold, Dorothy Smith: Backing Vocals

Charts

Weekly charts

Year-end charts

See also
List of number-one R&B albums of 1991 (U.S.)

References

1991 albums
Shabba Ranks albums
Epic Records albums
Grammy Award for Best Reggae Album